is a Japanese football player for Ayutthaya United in Thai League 2.

Club statistics

References

External links

j-league
Players Profile - Thai League

1987 births
Living people
Hiroshima University alumni
Association football people from Ehime Prefecture
Japanese footballers
J2 League players
Kazuki Murakami
FC Gifu players
Kazuki Murakami
Japanese expatriate footballers
Expatriate footballers in Thailand
Japanese expatriate sportspeople in Thailand
Association football central defenders
Association football fullbacks